Labordia is a genus of plant in family Loganiaceae. There are 16 species all endemic to Hawaii. It is closely related to Geniostoma

Species include:

 Labordia cyrtandrae (Baill.) H.St.John
 Labordia degeneri Sherff
 Labordia fagraeoidea Gaudich. 
 Labordia hedyosmifolia Baill. 
 Labordia helleri Sherff
 Labordia hirtella H.Mann
 Labordia hosakana (Sherff) W.L.Wagner, D.R.Herbst & Sohmer
 Labordia kaalae C.N.Forbes
 Labordia lorenciana K.R.Wood, W.L.Wagner & T.Motley
 Labordia lydgatei C.N.Forbes
 Labordia pumila (Hillebr.) Skottsb.
 Labordia sessilis A.Gray
 Labordia tinifolia A.Gray var. tinifolia
 Labordia tinifolia A.Gray var. lanaiensis Sherff
 Labordia tinifolia A.Gray var. wahiawaensis H.St.John
 Labordia triflora Hillebr.
 Labordia venosa Sherff
 Labordia waialealae Wawra
 Labordia waiolani Wawra

References

 
Endemic flora of Hawaii
Gentianales genera
Taxonomy articles created by Polbot